Giv'at Avni is a community settlement in northern Israel. Located adjacent to the Sea of Galilee and Tiberias, it falls under the jurisdiction of Lower Galilee Regional Council.

History
The village was founded in 1991 by the Lower Galilee Regional Council, It was named for Shlomo Avni,  director-general of the Ministry of Construction and Housing. Lavi Forest, named for the Jewish community that flourished there during the Mishnaic and Talmudic periods, is located on the western edge of Givat Avni.

Archaeology
In an archaeological survey of the area, flint outcrops and flint extraction surfaces were discovered along with numerous flint items, knapping piles, flakes and cores.

References

Community settlements
Populated places in Northern District (Israel)
Populated places established in 1991
1991 establishments in Israel
Sea of Galilee